Mahamadou Bamba N'Diaye (born 21 July 1990) is a Malian footballer who plays for French club Créteil.

Career
Born in Dakar, Senegal, N'Diaye began his career with Tontien Bamako and signed in February 2009 for Wydad Casablanca.

In 2010, he signed with Vitoria SC.

In November 2021, he joined Créteil in the French third-tier Championnat National.

International goals

Honours
Wydad Casablanca
Botola: 2009–10

Vitória Guimarães
Portuguese Cup: 2012–13

Sriwijaya
East Kalimantan Governor Cup: 2018

Mali
Africa Cup of Nations bronze: 2012, 2013

References

1990 births
Living people
Association football central defenders
Malian footballers
Mali international footballers
Senegalese footballers
Senegalese people of Malian descent
Footballers from Dakar
Wydad AC players
Vitória S.C. players
ES Troyes AC players
Sriwijaya F.C. players
Bali United F.C. players
Fath Union Sport players
US Créteil-Lusitanos players
Botola players
Primeira Liga players
Ligue 1 players
Ligue 2 players
Championnat National 3 players
Indonesian Super League players
Malian expatriate footballers
Expatriate footballers in Morocco
Expatriate footballers in Portugal
Expatriate footballers in France
Expatriate footballers in Indonesia
Malian expatriate sportspeople in Morocco
Malian expatriate sportspeople in Portugal
Malian expatriate sportspeople in France
Malian expatriate sportspeople in Indonesia
2012 Africa Cup of Nations players
2013 Africa Cup of Nations players
2017 Africa Cup of Nations players